Durga Bhabani is a village development committee in Baitadi District in the Mahakali Zone of western Nepal. At the time of the 1991 Nepal census it had a population of 2,052 and had 410 houses in the village.

References

Populated places in Baitadi District